Greycroft is an American venture capital firm. It manages over $2 billion in capital with investments in companies such as Bird, Bumble, HuffPost, Goop, Scopely, The RealReal, and Venmo. Greycroft was founded in 2006 by Alan Patricof, Dana Settle, and Ian Sigalow. The firm is headquartered in New York City and Los Angeles.

History
Greycroft was founded in 2006 by venture capital pioneer Alan Patricof. He previously founded Apax Partners, one of Europe's largest private equity groups with $50 billion under management. Patricof's transition is linked to a renewed desire for early-stage investing. Patricof is known for his investments and involvement with companies such as AOL, Apple Inc., Office Depot, and New York magazine.

Funds
Greycroft raised its first fund (Greycroft I) with $75 million of investor commitments in 2006, Greycroft II with $131 million in 2010, Greycroft III with $175 million fund in 2015, Greycroft IV with $200 million in 2018, Greycroft V with $250 million in 2018, and Greycroft VI with $310 million in 2020. In 2014, Greycroft raised its first growth fund, Greycroft Growth, with $200 million.

The company’s growth funds allow for investment in growth stage deals, with commitments starting at $10 million and scaling up to $35 million. Following the success of the firm's later stage investments, Greycroft raised Greycroft Growth II with $250 million in 2017. Greycroft raised Greycroft Growth III, a $368 million growth fund in 2020.

The firm is investing from two funds today:
 Greycroft VI: $310 million venture fund
 Greycroft Growth III: $368 million growth-stage fund

The venture fund (Greycroft VI) invests between $100,000 and $5 million in a first check, while the growth fund invests up to $50 million in a company. These two funds enable the firm to support entrepreneurs at any stage, from inception through exit.

Investments
Greycroft has invested in over 300 companies located in 45 cities internationally, with the majority of these companies headquartered in the United States.

The firm's notable investments include:
 Braintree, acquired by PayPal for $800 million in 2013
 Buddy Media, acquired by Salesforce.com for $800 million in 2012
 Candid, raised a $63.4 million Series B round in 2019
 Convoz, a startup founded by Chamillionaire.
 Maker Studios, acquired by Disney for $950 million in 2014
Plated.com, acquired by Albertsons  for $200 million in 2017
 Munchery, ceased operations in 2019
 Osmosis, raised a $4 million Series A round in 2019
 Selerio, acquired by Streem in 2019
 Trunk Club, acquired by Nordstrom for $350 million in 2014
 Venmo, acquired by PayPal for $800 million in 2016
 Boxed, raised $6.5M in 2014
 Scopely, raised $200M Series D round in 2019
 Yeahka, IPO executed on Hong Kong Stock Exchange in 2020
 BrightHealth, raised $200M Series C in 2018
 Anine Bing, raised $15M Series A in 2018
 App Annie, raised $63M Series E in 2016
 Thrive Market, raised $111M Series B in 2016
 The RealReal, whose IPO was executed in June 2019 and listed to Nasdaq
 Flutterwave, raised $35M Series B in 2019
 Acorns, raised $105M Series E round in 2019
 Icertis, became a "unicorn" and raised a $115M Series E in 2019
 Public.com, raised $15M Series B in 2020
 LEX Markets, raised $4M Seed in 2019
 Axios, raised $20M Series B  in 2017
 Huffington Post, sold to AOL for $315M in 2011
 Mapped, raised $6.5M Seed II in 2021
 Free Range Games, raised undisclosed amount Series A in 2015

References

Financial services companies established in 2006
Venture capital firms of the United States
Private equity firms of the United States